Sohag Gazi (born 5 August 1991) is a Bangladeshi international cricketer. He made his Test debut in first test during West Indies's tour of Bangladesh in 2012, taking six wickets in the second innings. He is the first and so far, only man to score a century and take a hat-trick in the same Test match and the first man to do it twice in first-class matches (the thirteenth to do it once).

Domestic career
A spinner, he made his first-class debut in January 2009 for Barisal against Chittagong, going on to become a regular throughout the 2009/10, 2010/11 and 2011/12 seasons.

A strong start to the 2012/13 season, including an innings of 119 in the opening game of the season against Khulna earned him his maiden Test call-up, and subsequently his Test cap.

He made his One Day debut in October 2010, helping Barisal reach the National Cricket One Day League Final of that year although he failed to take a wicket in a three-wicket defeat for his side.

In 2011, he played for the Bangladesh Academy against a Bangladesh XI, the Bangladesh Cricket Board XI against the touring West Indians and then Bangladesh A against West Indies. He also played two One Day games for Bangladesh A against the England Lions in 2012.

He was the leading wicket-taker for Central Zone in the 2017–18 Bangladesh Cricket League, with 29 dismissals in six matches.

In October 2018, in the 2018–19 National Cricket League, he took his 21st five-wicket haul in first-class cricket. He finished as the leading wicket-taker for Barisal Division in the tournament, with nineteen dismissals in five matches. Later the same month, he was named in the squad for the Rangpur Riders team, following the draft for the 2018–19 Bangladesh Premier League.

He was the leading wicket-taker for Mohammedan Sporting Club in the 2018–19 Dhaka Premier Division Cricket League tournament, with 22 dismissals in 16 matches. In November 2019, he was selected to play for the Sylhet Thunder in the 2019–20 Bangladesh Premier League.

International career
An off spinner in Bangladesh cricket is a rarity, but a cricketer turning up from Patuakhali, one of the southernmost districts of Barisal, has made a mark with that brand of bowling. Sohag Gazi is the rare specialist offspinner who grew up right by the Bay of Bengal, and has travelled the length and breadth of the country to be recognised as one of the promising slow bowlers in Bangladesh. His run-up is short, even by spinners' standards, but his bowling action itself is a whir, followed by a tight follow-through.

The call-up to the National Cricket Academy and the Bangladesh A team followed. He did well in the West Indies for the A team and against other second-string sides but he faced a few dark months in 2012 when an umpire at the Shafi Darashah tournament in Bangalore reported him for a kink in his elbow while bowling the quicker delivery. He went through the usual checks before being given the green signal to play first-class cricket in the 2012–13 season, one which he started off with nine wickets. A seven-wicket haul in the second innings included a hat-trick, and spectacularly, Sohag slammed a hundred in the same game, becoming only the thirteenth cricketer of all time to score a century and take a hat-trick in a first-class match.

He was soon picked up for the Bangladesh team for the first Test against West Indies in November 2012.
Having been called up to play against the West Indies in November 2012, he bowled the first ball of the first test in Mirpur. The ball was hit for six by Chris Gayle, the first time this had been achieved in the history of the game, although he finished the innings having bowled 47 overs with figures of three for 145.

His spell of 4 for 29 against West Indies at Khulna was nominated to be one of the best ODI bowling performance of the year by ESPNCricinfo.

In the first Test against New Zealand in October 2013, Gazi scored his maiden test century, remaining unbeaten on 101 as Bangladesh hit 501 in reply to New Zealand's 469. He followed this up with a hat-trick in New Zealand's innings, dismissing Corey Anderson, BJ Watling and Doug Bracewell in consecutive deliveries to become the first person in history to score a century and take a hat-trick in the same Test match. He became the second Bangladeshi to take a Test hat-trick after Alok Kapali.

ICC ban 
Bangladesh off-spinner Sohag Gazi has been suspended from bowling in international cricket with immediate effect after his action was found to violate the ICC's 15-degree limit. He was reported for a suspect action by ICC match officials in August, when on tour in the West Indies, and subsequent independent testing at an accredited facility revealed all of his deliveries were over the limit.

See also
 List of Bangladesh cricketers who have taken five-wicket hauls on Test debut

References

External links
 

1991 births
Living people
Bangladeshi cricketers
Bangladesh Test cricketers
Bangladesh One Day International cricketers
Bangladesh Twenty20 International cricketers
Cricketers who have taken five wickets on Test debut
Sylhet Strikers cricketers
Barisal Division cricketers
People from Barisal
Fortune Barishal cricketers
Rangpur Riders cricketers
Sheikh Jamal Dhanmondi Club cricketers
Prime Doleshwar Sporting Club cricketers
Prime Bank Cricket Club cricketers
Bangladesh South Zone cricketers
Test cricket hat-trick takers
Mohammedan Sporting Club cricketers